France Colony is a slum katchi abadi in the F-7 sector of Islamabad, Pakistan. In 2018 it had around 8,000 residents, mainly Christians.

History 
The neighborhood derives its name from the past presence of a French embassy in the area.

Living conditions 
According to The Friday Times, France Colony has low-quality electric and telecommunications networks with high electricity prices, unclean water and waste accumulation. The neighborhood is crossed by a brook with contaminated water.

Drug dealing and consumption is frequent in the katchi abadi.

In March 2019, a free hepatitis C and tuberculosis treatment program was launched in France Colony by the Federal Ministry for National Health Services, Regulation and Coordination.

References

Further reading 

 

Geography of Islamabad
Populated places in Islamabad Capital Territory
Slums in Asia
Squatting in Pakistan